Christopher Cross "Chris" Griffin(born February 8th) is a fictional character from the animated television series, Family Guy. He is the second of three children of Peter and Lois Griffin and is also the older brother of Stewie Griffin and the younger brother of Meg Griffin. He is voiced by the American actor, producer and writer, Seth Green, and first appeared on television, along with the rest of the Griffin family, in a 15-minute short on December 20, 1998. 

Chris Griffin was created and designed by the American actor and animator, Seth MacFarlane, who was asked to pitch a pilot to the Fox Broadcasting Company. The series pilot episode was based on The Life of Larry and Larry & Steve. It was composed of two shorts made by MacFarlane which featured a middle-aged man named Larry and an intellectual dog, Steve. After the pilot was given the green light, the Griffin family appeared in the episode "Death Has a Shadow".

Originally designed as a somewhat gregarious, yet unintelligent teenager, Chris has become more awkward and idiotic over the course of the show. Running gags in the series involving Chris include the existence of an 'Evil Monkey' in his closet (though it is later revealed that the monkey is not evil), his frequent masturbation, and his perverted admirer, the elderly Herbert who lusts after and repeatedly tries to prey on him throughout the show's run.

Character origins
The character of Chris Griffin resembles that of Milt's, the son of the main character Larry Cummings in The Life of Larry. The animated short film was created by Seth MacFarlane at the Rhode Island School of Design in 1995 which later led to the development of Family Guy, which aired three years later.

Seth Green has stated that his main inspiration for Chris' voice came from envisioning how the Buffalo Bill character from the thriller film The Silence of the Lambs would sound if he were speaking through a PA system at a McDonald's.

Personality

Similar to his sister Meg, Chris is portrayed as a typical adolescent, albeit one who comes off as being good-natured and easy-going. As such, the character tends to take things in stride, not worrying about much, seemingly enjoying his position in life. On the Volume 1 DVD Boxset TV guides special Family Guy edition, it is stated that Chris "wouldn't hurt a fly, unless it landed on his hot dog".

Chris is seemingly repeatedly willing to take drastic measures to get what he wants or needs, particularly when it comes to keeping up with his below-average grades in school. In one episode, he believes that he received a bad grade on his geometry test when he tickled his brain by sticking a plastic army man's rifle into his nose and accidentally puncturing a lobe.

Despite frequently displaying Peter's characteristic stupidity, Chris is portrayed as usually a faster learner than Peter, and has a variety of talents, such as filmmaking, video editing, etc. In "Patriot Games", when the family moves to London, Chris is the only member of the family who learns how to speak cockney English in a matter of seconds. Conversely, however, when his brother Stewie tries to help him prepare for a history exam in "Stewie, Chris, & Brian's Excellent Adventure", he seems to show great difficulty in grasping new ideas.

He also shares his father's cartoonistic lack of common sense, tends to be absent-minded, gets confused easily, and appears to be extremely naïve; in "Lethal Weapons", when Peter and Lois are having a fist fight, Chris cheers for the former, telling him to "kick her ass!". Earlier in the episode, after Chris breaks a vase with his basketball and Lois tells Peter to punish him with a spanking, Peter tells him to "punish [himself]" and subsequently spanks himself. In Stewie Griffin: The Untold Story, when the children watch Lois and Peter trying to make love, Chris mistakes it for a fight and says, "Meg, why do you think they're fighting?", but Meg angrily whispers to him "They're not." In the episode "Trading Places", after Chris accidentally damages Peter's dirt bike, Peter "punishes" him by making him start smoking.

Though Meg is humiliated or embarrassed by his actions like she is with Peter's actions, Chris usually loves and cares for her deeply, and the two are frequently shown to get along very well. Up until sometime during the sixth season, Chris is more socially active at school than Meg, having various friends, including several girls, while attending Buddy Cianci Junior High School, and later at James Woods Regional High School (now called Adam West High School). 

As the series progresses and Meg is seen more often with her group of friends, Chris' social status is reduced to the point of being unpopular and virtually friendless at James Woods Regional High School. While just as socially looked down upon as Meg (though to a lesser extent of being bullied), he is outwardly confident and spirited, mostly when dealing with the ups and downs of being a teenager, such as running for Homecoming King, standing up to bullies, lashing out against his date, and frequently acting out against Peter's hurtful ways. 

In "Stew-Roids", Chris' popularity increases drastically when the school's queen bee, Connie D'Amico, dates him. At first, she does this to be more popular because of "dating a loser", but she begins to see Chris as he really is after he says he likes her. Later in the episode, however, Chris' popularity turns him mean and shallow, and he dumps Connie after making out with two other girls at a house party. Connie and Meg then briefly team up to humiliate Chris by having Neil Goldman show the school a video of him re-enacting a scene from The Silence of the Lambs in which Buffalo Bill dances nude in front of a mirror, which results in Connie regaining her popularity, while Chris is socially demoted back to being an outcast. 

In "Once Bitten", Chris befriends Neil Goldman, the Jewish resident "nerd/geek" and Meg's self-proclaimed love interest. Although their friendship was initially a ploy for Neil to get closer to Meg, Neil feels bad for using Chris and returns to him to resume their friendship.

Evil Monkey
As a running gag, starting in the episode "Dammit Janet!", Chris is regularly tormented by the Evil Monkey, who lives in his closet, though whenever he complains about it to anyone, they often laugh along with him instead thinking it is a joke, after which the monkey appears with a malevolent grimace and points at Chris in a threatening and intimidating manner. In "Hannah Banana", Chris proves the monkey's existence to the family, though ends up becoming friends with him after the monkey (who appears not to be evil at all, but just a poor creature who was depressed after his ex-wife cheated on him with another monkey) helps him write out a book report and subsequently pass. 

The simian explains his frightening mannerisms as a result of various conditions and unintended actions. Chris introduces him to his friends, they hang out with each other in "fun" places, and the monkey helps Chris in his studies in school, which Peter does not do. This, however, causes a rift between Chris and Peter when the former realizes that the monkey cares more for him than his father. Eventually, the Evil Monkey helps the two characters to patch things up, especially after Peter saves the monkey from Miley Cyrus (who is depicted as an android) who had kidnapped him à la King Kong. After that, the monkey happily moves out of Chris' closet to live in the closet of Tom Tucker's son, Jake, where the cycle will start in anew, as Jake himself experiences difficulty with his father.

In a 2003 interview, Seth MacFarlane stated that the writers thought it would be funny to give Chris a childhood fear that is actually real, since he has "a childlike mind". The monkey's trademark grimace and pointing was the idea of writer Mike Barker.

Identification with Seth Green
Another running gag, starting in the Star Wars remake episode "Blue Harvest", has Chris defending the overall career of voice actor Seth Green, along with Robot Chicken, an Adult Swim show he co-created as an in-joke where Green and Seth MacFarlane are jokingly 'bitter competitors' in the field of adult animation. 

When Peter (MacFarlane) methodically denigrates Robot Chicken in "Blue Harvest", Chris loses his temper and storms off. Carried on in "Something, Something, Something, Dark Side", though Chris attempts to maintain a cool head, he storms off again when Peter offers to tell the story of Without a Paddle, a critically panned film that featured Green. Both these scenes happen in the framing device of the episode and not in the interior Star Wars narrative, in which Green portrays Chris as Star Wars hero Luke Skywalker. 

In the final Star Wars parody, "It's a Trap!", mocking Green's career provokes further dismay in Chris, who tries to defend Green by citing Buffy the Vampire Slayer as an example of a success in Green's career, but Carter Pewterschmidt argues that the popularity of Buffy was largely over-stated by coverage of the show by Entertainment Weekly. These taunts give Chris—in character as Skywalker—the conviction to fight back against Stewie/Darth Vader and Carter/Darth Sidious (both played by MacFarlane). In the closing scenes of the episode's framing device, Chris gets to reverse the joke by poking fun at MacFarlane's career, going so far as to suggest that Family Guy is a rip-off of The Simpsons; MacFarlane is then defended by the characters whom he voices (Peter, Brian and Stewie).

Outside of the Star Wars-themed episodes, "Road to the Multiverse" plays on the running gag, but with Stewie provoking the Robot Chicken universe counterpart of Chris by asking "How does it feel to be on a major network for thirty seconds?", which prompts Chris to scream "Fuck you!"

Chris' birthday is February 8, the same day as Seth Green.

References

External links
 Chris Griffin at Fox.com

Family Guy characters
Animated human characters
Television characters introduced in 1999
Animated characters introduced in 1999
Fictional characters from Rhode Island
Child characters in animated television series
Teenage characters in television
Male characters in animated series
Characters created by Seth MacFarlane
Fictional Irish American people
sv:Family Guy#Chris Griffin